The 2018 Skate Canada International was the second event of the 2018–19 ISU Grand Prix of Figure Skating, a senior-level international invitational competition series. It was held at Place Bell in Laval, Quebec from October 26–28. Medals were awarded in the disciplines of men's singles, ladies' singles, pair skating, and ice dancing. Skaters earned points toward qualifying for the 2018–19 Grand Prix Final.

Entries
The ISU published the preliminary assignments on June 29, 2018.

Changes to preliminary assignments

Records 

The following new ISU best scores were set during this competition:

Results

Men

Ladies

Pairs

Ice dancing

References

External links
2018 Skate Canada International

Skate Canada International
Skate Canada International
Skate Canada International
Skate Canada International